Chiang Khan is a district (amphoe) in the northern part of Loei province, northeastern Thailand.

Geography
Neighbouring districts are (from the east clockwise): Pak Chom, Mueang Loei, and Tha Li of Loei Province. To the northwest are the Xaignabouli and Vientiane Provinces of Laos.

The important water resources are the Mekong, Hueang, and Loei Rivers.

History
Chiang Khan was founded in the late-19th century when Lao villagers crossed the Mekong after the French colonised Laos. More migrants later arrived  from Vietnam and China. Chiang Khan became a trading hub largely due to its location on the river. People on both sides of the rivers exchanged goods, culture, and language. Trading stopped in 1975 when the communist Pathet Lao seized power from the Lao government and cut economic ties to Thailand. Chiang Khan languished until rediscovered in the early-21st century.

Administration
The district is divided into eight sub-districts (tambons), which are further subdivided into 78 villages (mubans). There are two townships (thesaban tambons), Chiang Khan and Khao Kaeo, each covering parts of tambons of the same names. There are a further seven tambon administrative organizations (TAO).

Economy
Fishing the Mekong River was formerly Chiang Khan's biggest earner.  Some 650,000 persons, Thai and foreign, visit the village every year.

Popular culture
Chiang Khan was used as the main setting for the 2014 romantic comedy Chiang Khan Love Story (Tookae Ruk Pang Mak), directed by Yuthlert Sippapak. It was the seventh highest-grossing film in Thailand in 2014.

Chiang Khan was referenced in 2018–19 TV drama's Channel 7 HD Nai Keun Nao Sang Dao Yung Oun as a backdrop for the story.

References

External links

amphoe.com (Thai)
Chiangkhan

Chiang Khan